Arachniodes aristata is a species of fern in the family Dryopteridaceae. The type specimen was collected by George Forster at an unknown island in the Pacific Ocean, when travelling on the second voyage of James Cook. This plant was first formally named Polypodium aristatum in 1786 in the Florulae Insularum Australium Prodromus, published by his father Johann Reinhold Forster. The specific epithet "aristata" derives from Latin, meaning "bearing a bristle".

References

Dryopteridaceae
Flora of New South Wales
Flora of Queensland
Ferns of Australia
Flora of China
Flora of Oceania
Flora of India (region)
Flora of New Zealand
Flora of New Guinea
Flora of Malesia
Plants described in 1786